"Hand Me Down My Bible" is a single written by Bill Martin and Phil Coulter, and performed by The Dubliners charting at No.7 in the Irish Singles Chart in 1971.

Charts

References

1971 songs
The Dubliners songs
Columbia Graphophone Company singles
1971 singles
EMI Records singles
Songs written by Bill Martin (songwriter)
Songs written by Phil Coulter